The Wellcome Institute for the History of Medicine (1968–1999) was a London centre for the study and teaching of medical history.  It consisted of the Wellcome Library and an Academic Unit.  The former was and is a world-class library collection owned and managed by the Wellcome Trust and staffed by librarians including academic librarians who held honorary lectureships at University College London.  The Academic Unit was a group of university staff appointed at University College London that conducted a programme of university teaching, thesis supervision, seminars, conferences and publications.

Directors of the Wellcome Historical Medical Museum and of the Wellcome Institute for the History of Medicine

 1913–1936 Henry S. Wellcome, LLD, DSc, FRS (Founder and Director)
 1913–1925 C. J. S. Thompson,  MBE (Curator)
 1925–1934 L. W. G. Malcolm, MSc, PhD,  FRSE (Conservator)
 1934–1947 Captain Peter J. Johnston-Saint, MA, FRSE (Conservator) (photo)
 1941–1945 Dr S. H. Daukes,  OBE, MD
 1946–1964 Edgar Ashworth Underwood,  MD, FRCP
 1964–1973 F. Noël L. Poynter, BA, PhD, Hon MD, FLA
 1973–1979 Edwin Sisterton Clarke, MD, FRCP
 1980–1981 Prof. Alfred Rupert Hall, MA, LittD, FBA (Chairman)
 1981–1983 Peter O. Williams, MB, FRCP
 1983–1987 Prof. William Paton, CBE, DM, FRCP, FRS

Librarians

 1900–1913 C. J. S. Thompson
 1913–1918 T. W. Huck, FLA
 1919–1921 C. C. Barnard,  MLA
 1921–1925 W. R. B. Prideaux, BA,  FLA (photo)
 1925–1931 C. R. Hewitt,  FLA
 1932–1946 S. A. J. Moorat, MA, DipLib (obit)
 1946–1953 W. J. Bishop, FLA
 1954–1964 F. Noël L. Poynter, BA, PhD, Hon MD, FLA
 1964–1973 E. Gaskell, BA, ALA
 1973–1996 Eric J. Freeman,  BA, ALA
 1996–2004 David Pearson

In 1999 the Wellcome Institute for the History of Medicine was terminated, and in its place two new organisations were created: The Wellcome Library and the Wellcome Trust Centre for the History of Medicine at UCL. Prof. Harold Cook was appointed Director of the Wellcome Centre at UCL from 2000-2009, while the following persons succeeded David Pearson as Librarians of the Wellcome Library.

 2004–2009  Frances Norton
 2010–2014  Simon Chaplin
 2015– Robert Kiley (acting)

Academic Unit in 1992
 William Bynum MA MD PhD MRCP (Head) Allen MA PhD (Life Sciences)
Janet Browne MA PhD (Life Sciences)
Lawrence I. Conrad PhD (Islamic Medicine)
 Christopher Lawrence MB ChB PhD (Clinical Medicine)
 Michael Neve MA PhD (Human Biology)
 Vivian Nutton MA PhD (Classical Medicine)
 Roy Porter MA PhD (Social History of Medicine)
 Elizabeth (Tilli) Tansey BSc PhD (Modern Medical Science)
 Andrew Wear BA MSc PhD (Early Modern Medicine)

See also 

 History of Modern Biomedicine Research Group

References

External links
 
 Booklet on the Wellcome Institute, 1983.
 Wellcome Trust Publications.
 The Wellcome Institute for the History of Medicine: A Brief Description (1992).

Arts organisations based in the United Kingdom
Archives in the London Borough of Camden
Cultural and educational buildings in London
Medical libraries
Academic libraries in London
Wellcome Trust
Research libraries in the United Kingdom